Water Grill is a fine-dining seafood restaurant in the United States. The original location is in Downtown Los Angeles. 
Additional locations are in Santa Monica, San Diego, Costa Mesa, Denver, Bellevue and Las Vegas.  It is owned by King's Seafood Company.

History

The original location is in Los Angeles. It is in the PacMutual Building. The architecture is Art Deco, including carved ceilings, brass doors, marble walls, and leather seats. Water Grill served "concept" seafood dishes. In 2011, the restaurant closed for one month. While closed, it underwent a $1.5 million renovation. Water Grill has been described as an "institution," in Los Angeles by the Los Angeles Times. Former chefs at the Los Angeles location include David LeFevre and Michael Cimarusti. In 2013, the Los Angeles location was named one of "38 Essential Los Angeles Restaurants," by Eater.

Food

Water Grill serves seafood. The restaurants have raw bars serving fresh seafood. The restaurants serve ten types of oysters and also serve sea urchin and bay scallops. Specific dishes include fritto misto, shrimp and grits, ragout, and squid ink pasta with calamari. Water Grill's crab cakes were named the best in Los Angeles in 2011 by Los Angeles Magazine.  Water Grill had earned one Michelin star in 2008 and 2009 however when Michelin updated their reviews in 2019, the restaurant received a reduced rating of a Michelin Plate.

Gallery

See also
 List of seafood restaurants

References

External links
 

Seafood restaurants in the United States
Restaurants in Los Angeles
Companies based in Santa Monica, California
Restaurants in Orange County, California
Companies based in San Diego
Restaurants in San Diego County, California
Restaurants in Las Vegas, Nevada